The Greek Women's Water Polo A1 League is the premier championship for women's water polo teams in Greece. It was founded in 1988, and it is currently contested by eight teams. Greek League is ranked as one of the top national domestic leagues in European water polo. The champion, the runner-up and the third-placed team qualify for the LEN Euro League.

The first champion was Ethnikos Piraeus. During the next years Glyfada NSC and NC Vouliagmeni dominated. At the last ten seasons Olympiacos Piraeus and Vouliagmeni are alternated at the top of the championship. Only four teams have won the championship so far. Olympiacos Piraeus have won the most championships (12), while being also the current champion (2020–21).

Greek clubs are among the most successful in European water polo. They have won fifteen titles in all European competitions. The teams have won the LEN Champions' Cup / LEN Euro League seven times, the LEN Super Cup and the LEN Trophy four times each. Concretely, Vouliagmeni have won two Champion Cups (2009, 2010), two LEN Super Cups (2009, 2010) and one LEN Trophy (2003), Olympiacos have won three LEN Euro Leagues (2015, 2021, 2022), two LEN Super Cup (2015, 2021) and one LEN Trophy (2014), Glyfada have won two Champion Cups (2000, 2003), and Ethnikos Piraeus have won two LEN Trophy cups (2010, 2022).

Champions

Performance by club

Greek clubs in European competitions
LEN Women's Euroleague :

LEN Women's Super Cup :

Women's LEN Trophy :

References

External links
Hellenic Swimming Federation
Greek League top scorers at Hellenic Swimming Federation (in Greek)

Gre
Water polo competitions in Greece
Recurring sporting events established in 1988
Sports leagues in Greece
1988 establishments in Greece
Water polo
Professional sports leagues in Greece